Donald Dowd (1923–2010) was a long-time campaign aide to the Kennedy family, including Senator Ted Kennedy. He was a member of the John F. Kennedy Library Foundation, and worked there for almost 25 years. Richard Neal described Donald as a legendary figure, and recalled him as a great friend and mentor. Dowd was the retired vice president of public affairs for Coca-Cola in Boston.

In 1968, Donald Dowd worked on the Presidential campaign of Robert F. Kennedy, and was on the campaign trail with Kennedy when Kennedy was shot dead at the Ambassador Hotel in Los Angeles on June 6, 1968. Dowd previously worked in President Kennedy's administration, in the Post Office Department.

Death
Dowd died on January 24, 2010, at the age of 87.

References

1923 births
2010 deaths
American businesspeople